Lego The Lone Ranger was a Lego theme based on the film of the same name. It is licensed from Walt Disney Pictures and Jerry Bruckheimer Films. The theme was first introduced in April 2013 and was discontinued by the end of 2014 in conjunction with the theatrical release of the film.

Overview 
Lego The Lone Ranger was based on the 2013 film The Lone Ranger. The product line focuses on the Lone Ranger and Tonto's earliest efforts to subdue local villainy and bring justice to the American Old West. Lego The Lone Ranger aimed to recreate the main characters in Lego form, including the Lone Ranger, Tonto, and Butch Cavendish's gang.

Development 
The Lego The Lone Ranger construction toy range was based on the film and developed in collaboration with Disney Consumer Products. The construction sets aimed to recreate the story and characters of the film in Lego form. Jill Wilfert, Vice President of licensing and entertainment stated, "We have not offered a Lego Western theme in over 10 years, and The Lone Ranger provided the quintessential inspiration with familiar characters, stories and scenes".

Launch 
Lego The Lone Ranger theme was launched at the American International Toy Fair in 2013. It also launched in London at the 2013 London Toy Fair. As part of the marketing campaign, The Lego Group released six Lego sets based on the film. Each set featured different scene from the movie in an Old West setting. Minifigures were released as well in the sets, including the Lone Ranger and Tonto. Additional minifigures including Barrett, Captain J. Fuller, Cavalry Soldiers, Comanches (Chief Big Bear and Red Knee), Dan Reid, Danny Reid, Latham Cole, Outlaws (Butch Cavendish, Frank, Jesus, Kyle and Ray), Rebecca Reid and Red Harrington were released as well. Each of the sets were also included the weapons are revolvers, rifles, tomahawks, spears, knives and a bow with quiver.

Characters 
 John Reid / Lone Ranger: A youthful, scrupulous lawyer later deputized a Texas Ranger, who protects his identity as the "Lone Ranger", a masked vigilante who seeks the perpetrators responsible for his brother's death.
 Tonto: The aged narrator of the events of his life as a Comanche who recruited John Reid to bring justice to those responsible for massacring his tribe during his childhood, and terrorizing frontier Texas settlements during the 1800s. The character wears black-and-white face paint and a deceased crow on his head.
 Butch Cavendish: A ruthless and cannibalistic outlaw, who Tonto believes is a wendigo.
 Latham Cole: A burly and unscrupulous railroad tycoon.
 Rebecca Reid: Dan's wife (later widow) and John's love interest/sister-in-law.
 Red Harrington: an ivory-legged brothel madam who assists Reid and Tonto.
 Dan Reid: John's older brother who is killed by Cavendish.
 Danny Reid: Rebecca and Dan's son, John's nephew.
 Captain Jay Fuller: An insecure and inexperienced United States Cavalry officer. He is also a corrupt official who is on Cole's payroll.
 Chief Big Bear: The leader of the Comanche.
 Frank: A member of Butch's gang who enjoys women's clothing.
 Barret: One of Cole's industry foremen.
 Ray: A member of Butch's gang.
 Jesus: A member of Butch's gang.
 Kyle: A member of Butch's gang.

Construction sets 
According to Bricklink, The Lego Group released a total of 8 Lego sets and promotional polybags as part of Lego The Lone Ranger theme. It was discontinued by the end of 2014.

In 2013, The Lego Group announced a partnership with Walt Disney Pictures and Jerry Bruckheimer Films to create a licensing and merchandising programme based on The Lone Ranger film, which was released on 15 April 2013. The six Lego sets being released were Cavalry Builder Set, Comanche Camp, Stagecoach Escape, Colby City Showdown, Silver Mine Shootout and Constitution Train Chase. In addition, two polybag sets were released as a promotions are Lone Ranger's Pump Car (set number: 30260) and Tonto's Campfire (set number: 30261). Two keychains of The Lone Ranger and Tonto were also released. The series acts as a thematic replacement for the popular Lego Wild West theme, featuring many of the same elements. The sets were designed primarily for children aged 6 to 14 years old.

Cavalry Builder Set 
Cavalry Builder Set (set number: 79106) was released on 15 April 2013. The set consists of 69 pieces with 4 minifigures. Cavalry Builder Set included defense wall, campfire with flames, a cannon with wheels and the Lone Ranger's horse, Silver. It also included variety of weapons and accessories as well. The set included Lego minifigures of the Lone Ranger and 3 cavalry soldiers. The set was released as a way for fans to build an army of soldiers.

Comanche Camp 
Comanche Camp (set number: 79107) was released on 15 April 2013. The set consists of 161 pieces with 3 minifigures. Red Knee's teepee included small campfire, entrance flap and removable canopy. It also included weapon rack can store all the weapons, canoe with oar and Rocky outcrop. The set included Lego minifigures of the Lone Ranger, Tonto and Red Knee.

Stagecoach Escape 
Stagecoach Escape (set number: 79108) was released on 15 April 2013. The set consists of 279 pieces with 5 minifigures. Red Harrington's stagecoach included opening doors and roof, baggage and opening vault. The stagecoach can detach the horses. The stagecoach didn't appear in the film. It also included Jesus’ horse, variety of weapons and accessories. The set included Lego minifigures of the Lone Ranger, Tonto, Red Harrington, Jesus and Barret.

Colby City Showdown 
Colby City Showdown (set number: 79109) was released on 15 April 2013. The set consists of 587 pieces with 5 minifigures and depicted Colby City's sheriff's office and bank. The sheriff's office included an opening door, jail and rooftop cannon. The bank included an opening door and vault. The set included Lego minifigures of the Lone Ranger, Tonto, Dan Reid, Ray and Frank.

Silver Mine Shootout 
Silver Mine Shootout (set number: 79110) was released on 15 April 2013. The largest set consists of 644 pieces with 5 minifigures. The Silver Mine included rocks, falling skull, secret waterfall entrance, ladder, turning crane, lowering bucket, trapdoor, chute, cart and a dynamite catapult launcher. It also included variety of weapons and accessories. The set included Lego minifigures of the Lone Ranger, Tonto, Chief Big Bear, Butch Cavendish and Kyle.

Constitution Train Chase 
Constitution Train Chase (set number: 79111) was released on 15 April 2013. The set consists of 699 pieces with 7 minifigures. Constitution Train included locomotive, coal car, wagon with rotating gatling gun, a prison wagon and a full set of track. Each of the train wagons can magnetically to each others. The train could be motorized with the LEGO Power Functions system and batteries, which were not included with the set. It also included the Lone Ranger's horse, Silver, variety of weapons, and accessories. The set included Lego minifigures of the Lone Ranger, Tonto, Rebecca Reid, Danny Reid, Butch Cavendish, Latham Cole and Captain J. Fuller.

Web shorts 
The product line was accompanied by a series of animated short films that was released on YouTube. These web shorts were inspired by the product line and the film. 
 Camping is an official web short released on YouTube on 20 September 2013. It features the Lone Ranger and Tonto on a camping trip.
 Shootout is an official web short released on YouTube on 20 September 2013. It features the Lone Ranger and Tonto battling against the outlaws.
 Bank Robbery is an official web short released on YouTube on 20 September 2013. It features the Lone Ranger and Tonto are stopping a bank robbery.

Reception 
In 2018, Stagecoach Escape (set number: 79108) and Constitution Train Chase (set number: 79111) was listed as the "Top 10 Western LEGO Sets" by Lego fansite BricksFanz.

See also
Lego Wild West
Lego Avatar
Lego Prince of Persia
Lego Pirates of the Caribbean
Lego Cars
Lego Toy Story
Lego Disney
Lego DOTS
Lego Brick Sketches
Lego Art

References

External links
 

Lone Ranger
Lone Ranger
Products introduced in 2013
Products and services discontinued in 2014